Half Moon Caye is an island and natural monument of Belize located at the southeast corner of Lighthouse Reef Atoll.  This natural monument was the first nature reserve to have been established in Belize under the National Park Systems Act in 1981 and first marine protected area in Central America.  This is also Belize's oldest site of wildlife protection since it was first designated as a bird sanctuary in 1924 to protect the habitat of the red-footed booby birds.

World Heritage Site
Half Moon Caye Natural Monument is part of the Belize Barrier Reef Reserve System World Heritage Site which was established on December 4, 1996, by the United Nations World Heritage Committee after they formally adopted seven marine protected areas along the Belize Barrier Reef and its adjacent atolls under UNESCO at their meeting in Mérida, Mexico.

Significant features
 The littoral forest, composed primarily of the orange-flowered siricote tree, provides an endangered and fragile habitat that supports one of the only viable breeding grounds for the red-footed booby colony in the western Caribbean. The booby colony supports the forest’s stability by providing guano as fertilizer. It is also a habitat tor the endemic Belize leaf-toed gecko (also known as the Belize atoll gecko) and Allison's anole lizard.
 The south eastern part of the island serves annually as a sea turtle nesting ground from May to November for the loggerhead, hawksbill, and green turtles, all endangered species.

References

1982 establishments in Belize
Parks in Belize
Protected areas established in 1982
Uninhabited islands of Belize